The 2014 European Wrestling Championships was held in Vantaa, Finland, from 1 April to 6 April 2014.

Medal table

Team ranking

Medal summary

Men's freestyle

Men's Greco-Roman

Women's freestyle

Participating nations

445 competitors from 39 nations participated:
 (3)
 (16)
 (11)
 (24)
 (24)
 (22)
 (5)
 (9)
 (3)
 (6)
 (10)
 (15)
 (12)
 (16)
 (22)
 (1)
 (13)
 (21)
 (1)
 (5)
 (10)
 (12)
 (10)
 (16)
 (7)
 (1)
 (1)
 (5)
 (17)
 (5)
 (17)
 (24)
 (6)
 (1)
 (9)
 (6)
 (12)
 (23)
 (24)

References

External links
 Official site – Sheets
  Official results

 
European Wrestling Championships
Europe
European Wrestling Championships
Sport in Vantaa
Wrestling Championships
Wrestling
April 2014 sports events in Europe